The 2019 FIBA Intercontinental Cup was the 28th edition of the FIBA Intercontinental Cup. The tournament took place from 15 to 17 February 2019. The tournament was held in Rio de Janeiro, Brazil, at the Carioca Arena 1.

Format
The tournament was held under a Final Four format, played by four teams, and included a third-place game.

Teams
The tournament was contested by four teams. The NBA opted to send the G League champions, rather than send the NBA champions.

Venue
When the event was announced, it was also announced that the game would be played at the Carioca Arena 1, the home arena of the tournament's host club, Flamengo. Carioca Arena 1 is located in Rio de Janeiro, Brazil. The arena was opened in 2016, and it has a seating capacity of 6,000 people for basketball games.

Bracket

Semifinals

Third place game

Final

Final standings

Final Four MVP 

  Jordan Theodore ( AEK)

References

External links
 Official website
 FIBA official website
 2019 FIBA Intercontinental Cup

2019
2019 in basketball
2019 in Brazilian sport
FIBA Intercontinental Cup
International basketball competitions hosted by Brazil
International sports competitions in Rio de Janeiro (city)